The Emigree is a poem by British author Carol Rumens. The poem is about emigration, which is where the word "Emigree", the French form of "emigrate" comes from.

Context

The poem explores the memory of the speaker and their experiences in a faraway city they spent time in as a child. The narrator reminisces about the place through her childhood eyes, although we see conflict between this and her adult perception of her homeland. The narrator pictures in her mind the country or city where (s)he was born.

An emigree is usually the term for someone who has to leave a country for political or social reasons.

Rumens is English and has no experience of emigration but left the place unspecific so it could apply to many different people’s experiences. The poet bases many of the ideas on modern examples of emigration from countries like Russia or the Middle East where people are fleeing corruption or tyranny, or those countries that change in their absence to some form of dictatorship.

References

British poems
Fiction about emigration